Tusk is the sixth album by the New Zealand noise rock band the Dead C, released in 1997 through Siltbreeze. Many of its songs were edited and trimmed from longer jams.

Critical reception
The Sunday Times wrote: "On the 11-minute 'Head' and the similarly expansive title track, simple riffs are pounded out by the usual guitar, bass and drums line-up, but the Dead C steer an identifiably structured course through the sort of freeform feedback most bands of the ilk would simply surrender to."

Track listing

Personnel 
The Dead C – production, mixing
Michael Morley – guitar, synthesizer, vocals
Bruce Russell – guitar, synthesizer
Robbie Yeats – drums, guitar, synthesizer

References

1997 albums
The Dead C albums